Cleveland College may refer to:

 Cleveland College of Art and Design, in Cleveland, England
 Redcar & Cleveland College, in Redcar, England
 Cleveland Medical College, in Cleveland, Ohio
 Cleveland–Marshall College of Law, in Cleveland, Ohio
 Cleveland Chiropractic College, in Overland Park, Kansas
 Cleveland Community College, in Cleveland County, North Carolina
 Cleveland State Community College, in Cleveland, Tennessee
 colleges in Cleveland
 colleges in Cleveland, Ohio

See also
 Cuyahoga Community College, in Cleveland, Ohio
 Cleveland State University, in Cleveland, Ohio
 Cleveland University (disambiguation)
 Cleveland School (disambiguation)